Lobo, officially the Municipality of Lobo,  is a 3rd class municipality in the province of Batangas, Philippines. According to the 2020 census, it has a population of 40,736 people.

Etymology
The name "Lobo" may have come from: 

The town was proclaimed as the "Atis Capital of the Philippines" through Resolution 2011-61 in September 2011.

Geography

Lobo has white sand beaches whose ocean floor slopes gradually for nearly  before a drop-off. It also has protected mangrove forests and fish sanctuaries.

According to the Philippine Statistics Authority, the municipality has a land area of  constituting  of the  total area of Batangas.

Barangays

Lobo is politically subdivided into 26 barangays.

Climate

Demographics

In the 2020 census, Lobo had a population of 40,736.

Economy

Government

Elected officials
Lota L. Manalo and Jurly R. Manalo are the current mayor and vice mayor, respectively.

The Municipal Councilors are:

 Dean Albert Araja
 Jan Michael Anyayahan
 Dok Tuklaw Dueñas
 Danny Diona
 Nilo Camo
 Ridian Dueñas
 Fred Umali
 Michael Cueto

Fish sanctuary

In 2005, the Lobo municipal government declared the Submarine Garden a fish sanctuary.

When the villagers, fishermen and local fisheries officials discovered that the sanctuary attracted more and more fishes, the entire  shoreline and  fronting the shores have been declared a protected area.

Fronting Calapan in Oriental Mindoro province and nearby Verde Island, the view is dotted by small boats and passenger ships dragging tails of foam.

Gallery

References

External links

 
 [ Philippine Standard Geographic Code]

Municipalities of Batangas